Cassis patamakanthini is a species of sea snail, a marine gastropod mollusk in the family Cassidae, the helmet snails and bonnet snails.

Description
Maximum length up to 50 mm.

Distribution
Found in Western Indian Ocean off the coast of Tanzania and occurs in South-West India .

References

External links

Cassidae
Gastropods described in 2000